Žigon is a village in the Municipality of Laško in eastern Slovenia. It lies in the hills to the southeast of Laško. The area is part of the traditional region of Styria. It is now included with the rest of the municipality in the Savinja Statistical Region.

A small roadside chapel-shrine in the settlement dates to the 19th century.

References

External links
Žigon on Geopedia

Populated places in the Municipality of Laško